Comandău is a commune in Covasna County, Transylvania, Romania. It is composed of a single village, Comandău.

It formed part of the Székely Land region of the historical Transylvania province.

It served as a filming location for season three of the comedy spy-thriller Killing Eve.'

Demographics

The commune has an absolute Székely Hungarian majority. According to the 2011 Census it has a population of 1,004 of which 94.32% or 947 are Hungarian.

References

Communes in Covasna County
Localities in Transylvania